Meen Kuzhambum Mann Paanaiyum is a 2016 Indian Tamil language fantasy comedy movie filmed in parts of West Malaysia, Indonesia and Cambodia. It was written and directed by Amudheshwar and produced by Dushyanth Ramkumar. The film stars Prabhu, Kalidas Jayaram, Ashna Zaveri and Pooja Kumar in the lead roles. It was promoted as Prabhu Ganesan’s 200th film. Principal photography of the film commenced in November 2015 in Chennai and the film got released exactly a year later. Kamal Haasan shot for a cameo appearance in the film. It also marked the feature film debut of Kalidas Jayaram- son of noted film actors Jayaram and Parvathy having appeared as a child artist during the early 2000s and also his official Tamil debut.

Plot
Annamalai (Prabhu) is a single parent to Karthik (Kalidas Jayaram) and owns an Indian restaurant in Malaysia. Annamalai is very fond of Karthik and loves to spend time with him, but Karthik is a fun-loving person who spends most of his time with friends and thinks that his father is too emotional. Karthik falls in love with his classmate Pavithra (Ashna Zaveri), daughter of an IFS officer (Urvashi) who is separated from her husband (Thalaivasal Vijay). Meanwhile, Mala (Pooja Kumar) is a don who falls in love with Annamalai as she is impressed by his cooking skill.

Annamalai worries that Karthik always prioritizes his friends than him. One day, they meet a saint named Swami (Kamal Haasan), who swaps both Annamalai and Karthik's souls to make them understand each other's love. Now Annamalai (in Karthik's body) goes to college, while Karthik (in Annamalai's body) takes care of the restaurant. Annamalai understands Karthik's love for Pavithra and gets close to her family. He also helps Pavithra's mother patch up with her husband in India. Similarly, Karthik understands the hardships faced by Annamalai in raising him from childhood following his mother's early demise and realizes his true love. Karthik also plans to have Mala marry Annamalai. There is also a don (M. S. Bhaskar) who happens to be Mala's boss and does not want her to marry Annamalai. The don kidnaps Pavithra and Mala. Following a comical fight, both are saved. Karthik apologizes to Annamalai for not understanding his love towards him. Immediately, both souls are swapped back. The movie ends with Karthik getting united with Pavithra, while Mala and Annamalai are also united.

Cast

 Prabhu as Annamalai
 Kalidas Jayaram as Karthik
 Ashna Zaveri as Pavithra
 Pooja Kumar as Mala
 Urvashi as Pavithra's mother
 M. S. Bhaskar as Don
 Ilavarasu as Annamalai's friend
 Santhana Bharathi as Pavithra's grandfather
 Thalaivasal Vijay as Pavithra's father
 R. S. Shivaji as Professor
 Thalapathy Dinesh
 Balaji
 Kamal Haasan as Swami (guest appearance)
 Y. G. Mahendra in a guest appearance
 Sudha Mahendra in a guest appearance
 Ester Noronha in a special appearance in the "Waka Wowra" song

Production
Dushyanth Ramkumar opted to set up a new production house, separate from his commitments for Sivaji Productions. Amudhesvar, who had previously worked as an associate to director Suseenthiran, was signed to direct the script. Production started in October 2015 and they started scouting for locations in Malaysia for the shoot for the film titled Meen Kuzhambum Mann Paanaiyum, starring Kalidas Jayaram, Ashna Zaveri and Prabhu. The film began production in Chennai during November 2015 and then held a second schedule in Malaysia during January 2016. Pooja Kumar joined the team during January 2016 and revealed that she would portray a female don based in Malaysia. Kamal Haasan later shot for a cameo appearance in the film during March 2016.

Soundtrack
The soundtrack was composed by D. Imman.

Release 
The Times of India gave the film a rating of two out of five stars and wrote that "With a not-so-bad story line, the director has tried his best to weave a fantasy story laced with humour". Other critics called the film "tedious".

References

External links

2016 films
2010s Tamil-language films
2010s fantasy comedy films
Films scored by D. Imman
Indian fantasy comedy films
Films shot in Malaysia
2016 directorial debut films
2016 comedy films